Farmington is a town in Alcorn County, Mississippi. The population was 2,186 at the 2010 census.

History 
Before 1850, Farmington was a prosperous village. Its prosperity suffered a blow, however, when it was bypassed during the construction of the Memphis & Charleston Railroad.

Geography

Communities near Farmington
 Burnsville - 
 Corinth - 
 Guys, Tennessee - 
 Michie, Tennessee - 
 Ramer, Tennessee -

Demographics

As of the census of 2000, there were 1,810 people, 685 households, and 537 families residing in the town. The population density was 484.2 people per square mile (186.9/km2). There were 746 housing units at an average density of 199.6 per square mile (77.0/km2). The racial makeup of the town was 97.85% White, 1.10% African American, 0.06% Native American, 0.55% Asian, 0.17% from other races, and 0.28% from two or more races. Hispanic or Latino of any race were 0.33% of the population.

There were 685 households, out of which 41.6% had children under the age of 18 living with them, 63.4% were married couples living together, 11.1% had a female householder with no husband present, and 21.6% were non-families. 19.6% of all households were made up of individuals, and 4.7% had someone living alone who was 65 years of age or older. The average household size was 2.64 and the average family size was 3.03.

In the town, the population was spread out, with 28.3% under the age of 18, 9.0% from 18 to 24, 30.3% from 25 to 44, 23.8% from 45 to 64, and 8.6% who were 65 years of age or older. The median age was 34 years. For every 100 females, there were 100.7 males. For every 100 females age 18 and over, there were 96.7 males.

The median income for a household in the town was $37,074, and the median income for a family was $41,696. Males had a median income of $29,531 versus $21,346 for females. The per capita income for the town was $16,327. About 4.1% of families and 4.9% of the population were below the poverty line, including 4.3% of those under age 18 and 9.2% of those age 65 or over.

Education
The town of Farmington is served by the Alcorn School District.

See also
 Siege of Corinth (First Battle of Corinth), American Civil War Battle
 Second Battle of Corinth
 Battle of Farmington, Mississippi

References

External links
 City of Farmington official website

Towns in Alcorn County, Mississippi
Towns in Mississippi